Vadym Yuriyovych Barba (Russian: Вадим Барба; born 7 September 1986) is a Ukrainian former footballer who is last known to have played as a midfielder for Pakruojis.

Career

Before the 2014 season, Barba signed for Kazakhstani second division side Makhtaaral from Kremin in the Ukrainian third division after almost signing for an Uzbekistani club.

Before the 2015 season, he signed for Kruoja in the Lithuanian top flight before joining Lithuanian second division team Pakruojis.

References

External links
 

Ukrainian footballers
Kazakhstan First Division players
A Lyga players
Expatriate footballers in Lithuania
Ukrainian expatriate footballers
Ukrainian expatriate sportspeople in Kazakhstan
Ukrainian Second League players
FC Palmira Odesa players
FC Zirka Kropyvnytskyi players
FC Podillya Khmelnytskyi players
FC Oleksandriya players
FC Kremin Kremenchuk players
FC Maktaaral players
FC Pakruojis players
Expatriate footballers in Kazakhstan
1986 births
Living people
Association football midfielders